The 1936–37 Illinois Fighting Illini men's basketball team represented the University of Illinois.

Regular season
New head coach Doug Mills took over the Illinois Fighting Illini men's basketball team for the 1936–37 season replacing Craig Ruby.  Mills was a player for the Illini from 1927 to 1930 and served as the assistant coach for the 1935–36 season. Mills' service toward the University of Illinois would continue until 1947 as head coach and until 1966 as athletic director.  Along with future head coach Harry Combes, the Illini returned 7 lettermen from a team that had finished in a third place tie in the Big Ten the year before.  Even though they lost 2 home games during conference play, the Illini finished the season in a tie for the conference championship with a record of 10 wins and 2 losses.  The team finished the season with an overall record of 14 wins 4 losses.  Along with Combes, the Illini also featured future major league baseball hall of fame shortstop and manager, Lou Boudreau.  The starting lineup included captain Robert Riegel at the center position, Boudreau and Combes at forward and Wilbur Henry, James Vopicka and Tom Nisbet at guard.  Following that season, the men's gymnasium got a new name, George Huff Gymnasium, after former Illinois athletic director George Huff, who died on October 1, 1936. During the championship season, Boudreau led the team in scoring with 8.7 points per game.

Roster

Source

Schedule

|-	
!colspan=12 style="background:#DF4E38; color:white;"| Non-Conference regular season

|- align="center" bgcolor=""

|-	
!colspan=9 style="background:#DF4E38; color:#FFFFFF;"|Big Ten regular season

Bold Italic connotes conference game
												
Source

Awards and honors
Harry Combes
Omaha World Newspaper 2nd team All-American

References

Illinois Fighting Illini
Illinois Fighting Illini men's basketball seasons
1936 in sports in Illinois
1937 in sports in Illinois